Margaret Justina Wrightson FRBS (1877–1976) was a British artist, renowned for her work in sculpture.

Early life and education 
Margaret Wrightson was born at Norton Hall and her father was the politician Sir Thomas Wrightson. She never married, and had a studio and home in Bedford Gardens in London. Wrightson's younger sister, Jocelyn Wrightson, was a painter, mainly working in watercolours.

Wrightson first studied under William Blake Richmond at the Royal College of Art before travelling to Paris to learn from Édouard Lantéri. From 1901, Wrightson exhibited frequently at the Royal Academy of Arts Summer Exhibition. She also exhibited with the Society of Women Artists and at the Walker Art Gallery in Liverpool.

Career 
Wrightson received many commissions throughout her long career. Theresa, Marchioness of Londonderry, commissioned Wrightson to create a female nude which was completed in 1912 and sold at Christies in 2014 for £68,500. Wrightson created a sculpture of a woman titled ‘Mechanic, Women’s Army Auxiliary Corps’ in 1917 that was later exhibited at the Royal Academy; the work had been suggested as a war memorial. In 1925 she created a 'Viking Warrior' for Walter Runciman. Wrightston's memorial of Admiral Earl Jellicoe stands in St Paul's Cathedral, London. Other public works include the figure of Saint George on the Cramlington war memorial in Northumberland, created in 1922, and a figure memorialising Charles Lamb, situated in the Inner Temple gardens, London.

Several of Wrightson's works are in the collection of National Trust's Mount Stewart, including the popular bronze of Lady Mairi as a child. The work was restored in 2012 after originally being commissioned in 1925, and erected in 1928.

Wrightson became an Associate member of the Royal Society of British Sculptors in 1929 and a Fellow in 1943. She was also a member of the Royal Academy.

Works

References

External links 
  
 Artworks by Margaret Wrightson in the National Trust collection
Information about Cramlington War Memorial, designed by Margaret Wrightson

1877 births
1976 deaths
20th-century British sculptors
20th-century English women artists
Alumni of the Royal College of Art
English expatriates in France
English women sculptors
People from the Borough of Stockton-on-Tees
Sculptors from London